The Sydney University Football Club, founded in 1863, is the oldest club now playing rugby union in Australia, although this date is disputed by historian Tom Hickie who argues that it was 1865.

Sydney Uni was a member of the inaugural Sydney club competition in 1874, along with the Balmain Rugby Union Football Club, Newington College and The King's School. The club currently competes in the Shute Shield competition and has the most senior premiership titles of all Sydney clubs.

After playing home games at the Sydney University Oval No.1 for 153 years, the club moved to the redeveloped Oval No.2 for the 2016 season. Sydney Uni Sport completed the building of a new training facility and grandstand at that ground accommodating 1,200 spectators.

Club information 
 Women's Rugby: Founded in 1994.
  Juniors: Founded in 2005 and comprises Balmain Junior Rugby Club, Canterbury Rugby and Petersham Juniors Rugby Club.  These clubs include girls and boys teams.

History 
The club is officially known as "Sydney University Football Club" because it was the first club of any football code in NSW. The club also played Australian rules football in its early history, making it the first NSW club in that code as well.

The club is often referred to as "Uni", “The Students" as well as "The Birthplace of Australian Rugby" or simply "The Birthplace".

Honours 
  Premiership Titles since 1900 (the Shute Shield started in 1923): (33) 1901 (shared), 1904, 1919, 1920, 1923, 1924, 1926, 1927, 1928, 1937, 1939, 1945, 1951, 1953, 1954, 1955, 1961, 1962, 1968, 1970, 1972, 2001, 2005, 2006, 2007, 2008, 2009, 2010, 2012, 2013, 2018, 2019, 2022

The Club has won 29 Shute Shield Major Premierships and has been runners-up 12 times. The Club has won 50 Premierships and has been runners-up 24 times since 1865.

Australian Club Champions: (5) 2007, 2008, 2013, 2014, 2020, 2022 (not contested), 2023

Gregor George Cup Club Championships: (24) 1927, 1937, 1941, 1942, 1961, 1983, 1999, 2001, consecutively from 2004 to 2019 and 2022

Jack Scott Cup: The Women's XVs team is notable in the Jack Scott Cup, winning 5 of the last 6 titles. In 2020, the Students picked up both Major and Minor Premierships after going through the regular season undefeated for the third year. The Women's team defeated Randwick 22–17 in the Grand Final.

*2021 SEASON CANCELLED In response to COVID-19 Sydney University was leading the competition without a loss when NSW Rugby Union (NSWRU) and its affiliate unions jointly made the tough decision to cancel all winter rugby competitions in the Sydney region (and Illawarra). Seven rounds were contested by the Shute Shield teams.

International representatives 
To date, 131 Sydney University players have been selected to play for Australia. The first Australian representative was Hyram Marks in 1899. The club's most famous Wallaby would probably be Nick Farr-Jones, who had a long representative career (including World Cup success as Captain in 1991).  Our most recent Wallabies are Lachlan Swinton and Angus Bell who debut in November 2020 v New Zealand.

Wallabies Squad – 2022
Angus Bell, Folau Fainga'a, Bernard Foley, Jake Gordon, Matt Philip, Tom Robertson Will Skelton and Sam Talakai

Australia A Squad – 2022
Tom Robertson, Brad Wilkin

England Squad – 2022
Guy Porter

Fiji Squad – 2022
Ratu Rotuisolia

Junior Wallabies Train-on Squad Squad – 2023
Jamie Clark, Oskar Hicks, Clem Haloholo, Henry O'Donnell, Tom Morrisson,

Rugby World Cup Winners

Bob Egerton and Nick Farr-Jones (Captain) - 1991

Richard Harry - 1999

Women's Rugby

The Club has produced 13 Australian Female Representatives of which 11 are Wallaroos; our most recent debutant is Piper Duck (October 2022 v Scotland during the Rugby World Cup in New Zealand).

Wallaroos Squad – 2022 RWC
Iliseva Batibasa, Emily Chancellor, Lori Cramer, Piper Duck, Grace Hamilton, Sera Naiqama, Bridie O'Gorman and Adiana Talakai

# Denotes Uncapped Wallaroo / Wallaby

Super Rugby players 2023 

 Angus Bell – NSW Waratahs
 Jake Gordon – NSW Waratahs
 Harry Johnson-Holmes – NSW Waratahs
 Tom Lambert – NSW Waratahs
 Lachlan Swinton – NSW Waratahs
 Tolu Latu – NSW Waratahs
 Zak von Appen – NSW Waratahs

 Josh Kemeny – Melbourne Rebels
 Matt Philip – Melbourne Rebels
 Theo Strang – Melbourne Rebels
 Brad Wilkin – Melbourne Rebels
 Sam Talaki - Melbourne Rebels

 Folau Fainga'a – Western Force

 Tom Robertson – Western Force
 Charlie Hancock – Western Force
 Tom Horton - Western Force
 Henry Robertson - Western Force

Super W players 2022 
 Grace Hamilton – Waratahs (Captain)
 Iliseva Batibasaga – Waratahs
 Emily Chancellor – Waratahs
 Fi Jones – Waratahs
 Sera Naiqama – Waratahs
 Adiana Talakai – Waratahs
 Bridie O'Gorman – Waratahs
 Piper Duck – Waratahs
 Brianna Hoy – Waratahs
 Penelope Leiataua – Waratahs
 Faliki Pohiva – Waratahs
 Georgina Tuipulotu – Waratahs, at 17 years, 4 months and 13 days became the youngest player ever to represent the Waratahs, a record previously held by Kurtley Beale
 Tiarah Minns – Melbourne Rebels
 Jemima McCalman – Presidents XV
 Isia Norman-Bell – Presidents XV
 Claudia Nielsen- Presidents XV
 Tylah Vailance – Presidents XV

  # Denotes Uncapped

See also

References

External links 
Sydney University Football Club website

Rugby clubs established in 1863
Rugby
Rugby union teams in Sydney
1863 establishments in Australia
University and college rugby union clubs in Australia